The term strips has various meanings:

 The plural of strip
 A financial option composed of one call option and two put options with the same strike price
 A treasury security acronym for Separate Trading of Registered Interest and Principal of Securities, which are the securities obtained when trading the coupons and principal of bonds separately
 Stanford Research Institute Problem Solver, an artificial intelligence system for automated planning
 Chicken strips